Robert Harris (December 17, 1966 – December 14, 1995) was an American skysurfing champion. He was the skysurfing world champion of 1994 and 1995. In December 1995, while shooting the Mountain Dew "007" commercial, based on the titular fictional character, directed by David Kellogg and lensed by Janusz Kamiński, Harris was flying in the sky when his parachute failed to open, causing him to fall to his death.

Memorialization
The song "Fall Free" from Alan Parsons's 1996 release On Air is dedicated to the vision of Harris, as is 
Bobby-B's "99 Rips and Beyond"; the latter album includes a picture of him in the booklet.

After his death, the Rob Harris Foundation was set up in his memory.

Rob Harris was a roommate of Hip Hop artist Daddy X, producer of the Kottonmouth Kings, and they frequently refer to his memory in many of their songs. For example, in the song "Misunderstood", rapper Saint Dog is heard saying "we miss Rob Harris" more than once. Saint Dog also raps, "Like DJ Rob Harris, kid I'm soaring," in the song "Life Ain't What It Seems" off the Kottonmouth Kings debut album, Royal Highness.

References

External links
Rebuttal of the urban legend on snopes.com

1966 births
1995 deaths
American skydivers
Accidental deaths from falls
Filmed deaths from falls